The White Kocher is a river in Baden-Württemberg, Germany. At its confluence with the Black Kocher (Schwarzer Kocher) in Unterkochen, the Kocher is formed.

See also
List of rivers of Baden-Württemberg

Rivers of Baden-Württemberg
Rivers of Germany